Dawg Fight is a documentary film directed by Billy Corben about the mixed martial arts career and personal life of Bellator MMA fighter Dhaffir Harris aka Dada 5000. The documentary is critically acclaimed for its sobering account of the brutal sport  no holds barred fighting and bareknuckle fighting. It was also the last film appearance of Kimbo Slice before his death in 2016.

Reception
The film received positive responses from critics.

References

External links 

 http://www.rakontur.com/
 http://www.dawg-fight.com/

2015 films
Documentary films about sportspeople
American sports documentary films
Mixed martial arts documentaries
Films directed by Billy Corben
2010s English-language films
2010s American films